Ever Salas  (born January 2, 1983) is a Colombian defender that plays for Carabobo FC of Venezuela.

External links
 BDFA profile

1983 births
Living people
Colombian footballers
Atlético Junior footballers
Alianza Petrolera players
Carabobo F.C. players
Colombian expatriate footballers
Expatriate footballers in Venezuela
Association football defenders
Footballers from Barranquilla
21st-century Colombian people